KHLA (92.9 FM) is a classic hits formatted broadcast radio station licensed to Jennings, Louisiana, serving Southwest Louisiana.  KHLA is owned and operated by Townsquare Media.  The station's studios are located on North Lakeshore Drive, just northwest of downtown Lake Charles, and its transmitter is located south of Iowa, Louisiana.

References

External links
92.9 The Lake Online

1963 establishments in Louisiana
Classic hits radio stations in the United States
Radio stations established in 1963
HLA
Townsquare Media radio stations